Horst Leuchtmann (26 April 1927 – 10 April 2007) was a German musicologist.

Early life and education
Leuchtmann was born in Braunschweig. He was a student of the composer Philippine Schick (1893–1970). They compiled a German-English dictionary of music (R. D. Brühs, F. Messmer, R. Reitzer: Philippine Schick, Tutzing 2005).

He was promoted to the Doctorate in 1957, having completed his thesis, The Musical Interpretations of Words in the Motets of the Magnum Opus Musicum by Orlando di Lasso.

Career
Leuchtmann became a research associate at the Bavarian Academy of Sciences and Humanities. From 1983 to 1995, he was a lecturer (since 1986 in an honorary professorship) at the Hochschule für Musik und Theater München, and from 1986 to 1995 he held lectureship at the Ludwig-Maximilians-Universität München.

The focal points of his research were the music of the 16th century and the modern era. On behalf of the Bavarian Academy of Sciences and Humanities, he compiled an index of the compositions of Orlando di Lasso.

From 1972 to 1995, Leuchtmann was editor for Musik in Bayern (Music in Bavaria), the journal of the Society for Bavarian Music History. He was senior editor for the 1978 published polyglot music dictionary Terminorum Musicae Index Septem Linguis Redactus.

Honors and awards
 Member of the Bavarian Academy of Fine Arts (1989)
 Dr. Jürgen Krackow Prize (1995) by the Bavarian Academy of the Sciences
 Honorary Professor at the Hochschule für Musik und Theater München (1986)
 Federal Cross of Merit (1996)

Personal life and demise
Leuchtmann died at age 96 on 10 April 2007, and he was buried at the Neukeferloh cemetery on 27 April.

Publications 
 Die musikalischen Wortausdeutungen in den Motetten des Magnum Opus Musicum von Orlando di Lasso, Dissertation 1959
 Kritik und Betrachtung – Gesammelte Aufsätze und Kritiken (with Alexander Berrsche und Hermann Rinn), 2. Revised edition of the Trösterin Musica edited by Harmann Rinn and Hans Rupe., 1964
 Orlando di Lasso. Sein Leben. Versuch einer Bestandsaufnahme der biographischen Einzelheiten, Wiesbaden 1976
 Wörterbuch Musik: Dictionary of Terms in Music: English-German/ German-English, Munich 1977
 Musik. Menschen, Instrumente und Ereignisse in Bildern und Dokumenten (with Christian Barth and Holger Fliessbach), Dortmund 1979
 Die Münchner Fürstenhochzeit von 1568. Massimo Troiano: Dialoge. Zwiegespräche über die Festlichkeiten bei der Hochzeit des bayerischen Erbherzogs Wilhelm V. with Renata of Lorraine, in Munich, im Februar 1568. (Faksimile, ed.), Munich and Salzburg 1980, 
 Orlando di Lasso. Musik der Renaissance am Münchner Fürstenhof. Ausstellung zum 450. Geburtstag (with Helmut Hell), Wiesbaden 1982
 Carl Orff. Ein Gedenkbuch, Tutzing 1985
 Yehudi Menuhin. Kunst als Hoffnung für die Menschheit. Reden und Schriften. Mit einer Laudatio von Pierre Bertaux, Munich 1986
 Quaestiones in musica. Festschrift für Franz Krautwurst zum 65. Geburtstag (with Friedhelm Brusniak), Tutzing 1989
 65. Bachfest der Neuen Bachgesellschaft Leipzig. Munich, 13. bis 19. November 1990. Beiträge und Programme (as publisher.), Tutzing 1990
 Orlando di Lasso. Prachthandschriften und Quellenüberlieferung. Aus den Beständen der Bayerischen Staatsbibliothek München (with Hartmut Schaefer), Tutzing 1994
 Orlando di Lasso. Prachthandschriften und Quellenüberlieferung. Aus den Beständen der Bayerischen Staatsbibliothek München – Zum 400. Todestag anlässlich der gleichnamigen Ausstellung in der Bayerischen Staatsbibliothek München, vom 1. Juni bis 30. Juli 1994 (with Hartmut Schaefer), Tutzing 1994
 Musik in Bayern, Halbjahresschrift der Gesellschaft für Bayerische Musikgeschichte e.V., issue 53, Tutzing 1997
 Motette und Messe (with Siegfried Mauser), 1998

References

Further reading 
 Festschrift für Horst Leuchtmann zum 65. Geburtstag, edited by Bernhold Schmid and Stephan Hörner. Tutzing: H. Schneider, 1993 
Kürschners Deutscher Gelehrten-Kalender 2001, vol. II, Munich 2001
 Anzeige in der Süddeutschen Zeitung, 14 April 2007

External links 
 
 

20th-century German musicologists
Academic staff of the University of Music and Performing Arts Munich
1927 births
2007 deaths
Writers from Braunschweig